The Otaka prize (尾高賞 Otaka-shō) is a prize annually awarded since 1953. It is named after the Japanese composer and conductor Hisatada Otaka, the prize is given to Japanese composers, and is awarded by the NHK Symphony Orchestra. Awardees include, Toshi Ichiyanagi, Shinichiro Ikebe, Toshiro Mayuzumi and the first woman awardee, Keiko Fujiie.

References

External links
Official website 

NHK
Visual arts awards
Japanese music awards
Awards established in 1953
1953 establishments in Japan